Moustapha Lô (died 15 June 1967) was a Senegalese man who attempted to assassinate Senegalese President Léopold Sédar Senghor on 22 March 1967 at the Dakar Grand Mosque. Lô was convicted of treason, was sentenced to death by a Senegalese court and was executed by firing squad. Lô was the second of two people who have been executed by Senegal since its independence in 1960.

Notes

References
Elimane Fall, "La démocratie à l'épreuve", Jeune Afrique, no. 1760, 1994-10-05
Keesing's Publications (1972). Africa Independent: A Survey of Political Developments (New York: Scribner) p. 236

1967 deaths
1967 crimes in Senegal
20th-century executions for treason
People executed by Senegal by firing squad
Executed Senegalese people
Failed assassins
People executed for treason against Senegal
Senegalese assassins
Year of birth missing
People executed for attempted murder
People executed for murder